Paradrillia dainichiensis is a species of sea snail, a marine gastropod mollusk in the family Horaiclavidae.

Description

Distribution
This marine species occurs off Japan. It was also found as a fossil in Pliocene and Quaternary strata in Japan.

References

 Yokoyama M. (1923) On some Fossil Mollusca from the Neogene of Izumo; Jap. Journ. Geol. and Geogr. vol.2 no. 1
 Matsui, S., 1985a: Recurrent molluscan associations of the Omma-Manganji fauna in the Gojome-Oga area, northeast Honshu. Part 1. General discussions of fauna and systematic notes on gastropod and scaphopod species. Transactions and Proceedings of the Palaeontological Society of Japan. New Series, no. 139, pp. 149–179, pls. 22–23.
 Ozawa, T., Tanaka, T. and Tomida, S., 1998: Pliocene to Early Pleistocene Warm Water Molluscan Fauna from the Kakegawa Group, Central Japan. Bulletin of the Nagoya University Furukawa Museum. Special Report, vol.7, pp. 1–204

External links
 Yokoyama, Matajiro. "Tertiary mollusca from Dainichi in Totomi." (1923)

dainichiensis
Gastropods described in 1923